Piano Sonata No. 3 may refer to:
 Piano Sonata No. 3 (Beethoven)
 Piano Sonata No. 3 (Boulez)
 Piano Sonata No. 3 (Brahms)
 Piano Sonata No. 3 (Chávez)
 Piano Sonata No. 3 (Chopin)
 Piano Sonata No. 3 (Enescu)
 Piano Sonata No. 3 (Hindemith)
 Piano Sonata No. 3 (Krenek), Op. 92, No. 4
 Piano Sonata No. 3 (Mozart)
 Piano Sonata No. 3 (Persichetti), Op. 22
 Piano Sonata No. 3 (Prokofiev)
 Piano Sonata No. 3 (Schubert)
 Piano Sonata No. 3 (Schumann)
 Piano Sonata No. 3 (Scriabin)

See also
 Cello Sonata No. 3 (disambiguation)
 Violin Sonata No. 3 (disambiguation)